Tropix is the fourth studio album by Brazilian singer-songwriter Céu.  It was released  March 25, 2016. The album was produced by Pupillo (Nação Zumbi drummer) and French Hervé Salters.

The album won two Latin Grammy Awards at the 17th Latin Grammy Awards for Best Portuguese Language Contemporary Pop Album and Best Engineered Album.

Track listing

References

2016 albums
Céu albums
Portuguese-language albums
Latin Grammy Award for Best Portuguese Language Contemporary Pop Album